The Cat Who Played Brahms is the fifth book in The Cat Who series, published in 1987.

Plot
Jim Qwilleran decides to get out of the city for a while and go on vacation to Moose County, Pickax, in the countryside. He stays at a lakeside cabin, owned by his old friend, Aunt Fanny.  He has plans to write a book, however his plans get delayed when a peaceful fishing trip catches a body.  Or is it simply an old tire, like the locals claim?

Awards
The novel was nominated for the 1988 Anthony Award in the "Best Paperback Original" category, losing out to The Monkey's Raincoat by Robert Crais.

References

1987 novels
Played Brahms
Novels about cats